Milda Lauberte (7 October 1918 in Vildoga – October 19, 2009 in Riga) was a Latvian chess master.

She played in two Women's World Championship tournaments, sharing third place with Sonja Graf, behind Vera Menchik and Clarice Benini at Stockholm 1937, and taking sixth place at Buenos Aires 1939 (V. Menchik won).

References

1918 births
Latvian female chess players
Soviet female chess players
2009 deaths
Riga Stradiņš University alumni
20th-century chess players